Kensal Green Cemetery is a cemetery in the Kensal Green area of Queens Park in the Royal Borough of Kensington and Chelsea in London, England. Inspired by Père Lachaise Cemetery in Paris, it was founded by the barrister George Frederick Carden. The cemetery opened in 1833 and comprises  of grounds, including two conservation areas, adjoining a canal. The cemetery is home to at least 33 species of bird and other wildlife. This distinctive cemetery has memorials ranging from large mausoleums housing the rich and famous to many distinctive smaller graves and includes special areas dedicated to the very young. It has three chapels and serves all faiths. It is one of the Magnificent Seven cemeteries in London.

The cemetery was immortalised in the lines of G. K. Chesterton's poem "The Rolling English Road" from his book The Flying Inn:

Despite its Grecian-style buildings, the cemetery is primarily Gothic in character, due to the high number of private Gothic monuments. Due to this atmosphere, the cemetery was the chosen location of several scenes in movies, notably in Theatre of Blood.

The cemetery is listed Grade I on the Register of Historic Parks and Gardens. It remains in use.

Location
The cemetery is in London's Royal Borough of Kensington and Chelsea. Its main entrance is on Harrow Road (west of where Ladbroke Grove and Chamberlayne Road meet). Its other entrance, Alma Place (the West Gate, almost opposite Greyhound Road) is also on the north side. Alma Place leads to the West London Crematorium (whose owner and operator is the same) and St. Mary's Roman Catholic Cemetery, which are in the London Borough of Hammersmith and Fulham. The cemetery lies between Harrow Road and the Paddington Arm of the Grand Union Canal to the south which has long been separated by a wall.

A set of defunct gates is set in the southern wall which adjoins the canal where barges took a proportion of earth from excavating graves and occasionally coffins carried by barge were unloaded.

History and description

Establishment and design
George Frederick Carden had failed with an earlier attempt to establish a British equivalent to Paris's Père Lachaise Cemetery in 1825, but a new committee established in February 1830, including Andrew Spottiswoode, MP for Saltash, sculptor Robert William Sievier, banker Sir John Dean Paul, Charles Broughton Bowman (first committee secretary), and architects Thomas Willson (who had previously proposed an ambitious Metropolitan Sepulchre project) and Augustus Charles Pugin, gained more financial, political and public support to fund the "General Cemetery Company". Public meetings were held in June and July 1830 at the Freemasons' Tavern, and Carden was elected treasurer.

However, Paul and Carden were already embroiled in a dispute regarding the design of the cemetery, where Paul favoured the Grecian style and Carden the Gothic style. A succession of architects were contemplated, including Benjamin Wyatt (who declined), Charles Fowler (proposal not taken up), Francis Goodwin, Willson, and a Mr Lidell, a pupil of John Nash, before an architectural competition was launched in November 1831. This attracted 46 entrants, and in March 1832 the premium was awarded, despite some opposition, for a Gothic Revival design by Henry Edward Kendall; this decision was, however, eventually overturned.

On 11 July 1832, the Act of Parliament establishing a "General Cemetery Company for the interment of the Dead in the Neighbourhood of the Metropolis" gained Royal Assent. The Act authorised it to raise up to £45,000 in shares, buy up to 80 acres of land and build a cemetery and a Church of England chapel. Company directors appointed after the Bill received Royal Assent asserted their control and preference for a different style. One of the competition judges and a company shareholder, John Griffith of Finbury, who had previously produced working drawings for a boundary wall, ultimately designed the cemetery's two chapels and the main gateway and 15,000 trees were supplied and planted by Hugh Ronalds from his nursery in Brentford. Founded as the General Cemetery of All Souls, Kensal Green, the cemetery was the first of the "Magnificent Seven" garden-style cemeteries in London. It was consecrated on 24 January 1833 by Charles James Blomfield, the Bishop of London, receiving its first funeral the same month.

In the early 1850s, after a series of cholera epidemics in London caused an examination of London's burial facilities, health commissioner Edwin Chadwick proposed the closure of all existing burial grounds in the vicinity of London other than the privately owned Kensal Green Cemetery, north-west of the city, which was to be nationalised and greatly enlarged to provide a single burial ground for west London. The Treasury was sceptical that Chadwick's scheme would ever be financially viable, and it was widely unpopular. Although the Metropolitan Interments Act 1850 authorised the scheme, it was abandoned in 1852.

Layout

The overall layout is on an east–west axis, with a central path leading to a raised chapel towards the west. The entrance is to the north-east and the largest monuments line the central path to the chapel.

The Church of England was allotted 39 acres and the remaining 15, clearly separated, acres were given over to Dissenters, a distinction deemed crucial at the time. Originally there was a division between the Dissenters' part of the cemetery and the Anglican section. This took the form of a "sunk fence" from the canal to the gate piers on the path. There were also decorative iron gates. The small area designated for non-Anglican burials is approximately oval in shape and was formerly made prominent by a wider central axis path that terminated with the neo-classical chapel with curved colonnades. The Anglican Chapel dominates the western section of the cemetery, being raised on a terrace beneath that is an extensive catacomb; there is a hydraulic catafalque for lowering coffins into the catacomb.

It is still in operation today; burials and cremations take place daily, although cremations are now more common than interments. The cemetery is still run by the General Cemetery Company under its original Act of Parliament. This mandates that bodies there may not be exhumed and cremated or the land sold for development. Once the cemetery has exhausted all its interment space and can no longer function as a cemetery, the mandate requires that it shall remain a memorial park. The General Cemetery Company constructed and runs the West London Crematorium within the grounds of the cemetery.

While borrowing from the ideals established at Père Lachaise some years before, Kensal Green Cemetery contributed to the design and management basis for many cemetery projects throughout the British Empire of the time. In Australia, for example, the Necropolis at Rookwood (1868) and Waverley Cemetery (1877), both in Sydney, are noted for their use of the "gardenesque" landscape qualities and importantly self-sustaining management structures championed by the General Cemetery Company.

The cemetery is the burial site of approximately 250,000 individuals in over 65,000 graves, including upwards of 500 members of the British nobility and 970 people listed in the Dictionary of National Biography. Many monuments, particularly the larger ones, lean precariously as they have settled over time on the underlying London clay.

Notable structures

Many buildings and structures within Kensal Green are listed.

The Anglican Chapel is listed Grade I, while the Dissenters' Chapel, Kensal Green is listed Grade II* and the  colonnade/catacomb and perimeter walls and railings are listed Grade II. Of the many tombs, memorials and mausoleums, eight are listed Grade II*, while The Reformers' Memorial is listed Grade II. The Tomb of Charles Spencer Ricketts is listed Grade II* and was designed by William Burges.

The Anglican Chapel
The Anglican Chapel is at the centre of the cemetery, and contains several tombs. The chapel was damaged during the Second World War but was restored in 1954. Under the chapel is a catacomb, one of the few in London. The catacomb is currently not maintained but can be visited as part of a guided tour. It still has a working coffin-lift or catafalque, restored by The Friends of Kensal Green Cemetery in 1997.

Dissenters' Chapel

Situated in the eastern corner of the cemetery this Greek Revival structure was for the use of all non-Anglican denominations and of non-believers. Only part of the cemetery was consecrated, and Dissenters could opt to be buried in the non-consecrated areas following a service here. The cemetery became favoured by nonconformists, free-thinkers, non-Christians and atheists, and thus this chapel became popular. The Dissenters' Chapel had become derelict and partly roofless, so in 1995 was leased to the Historic Chapels Trust who undertook £447,000 of restoration. The chapel currently serves as the office of The Friends of Kensal Green Cemetery, but is also available for funeral services.

The Reformers' Memorial
The Reformers' Memorial was erected in 1885. It was erected at the instigation of Joseph Corfield "to the memory of men and women who have generously given their time and means to improve the conditions and enlarge the happiness of all classes of society". The monument has lists of names of reformers and radicals on its north and east sides (together with further names added in 1907 by Emma Corfield). It is paired with the Robert Owen memorial, and a second instance of a non-funerary memorial in the cemetery's nonconformist section.

The memorial was amended to include Lloyd Jones to recognise his contribution.

"THIS MEMORIAL
IS RAISED AS A TOKEN OF REGARD TO THE
BRAVE MEN AND WOMEN WHOSE NAMES IT BEARS BY JOSEPH W. CORFIELD,
AUGUST 1895."

"THE REFORMERS' MEMORIAL

ERECTED TO THE GLORY OF MEN AND WOMEN WHO HAVE GENEROUSLY GIVEN THEIR TIME AND MEANS TO IMPROVE THE CONDITIONS AND ENHANCE THE HAPPINESS OF ALL CLASSES OF SOCIETY. THEY HAVE FELT THAT A FAR HAPPIER AND MORE PROSPEROUS LIFE IS WITHIN THE REACH OF ALL MEN, AND THEY HAVE EARNESTLY SOUGHT TO REALIZE IT. THE OLD BRUTAL LAWS OF IMPRISONMENT FOR FREE PRINTING HAVE BEEN SWEPT AWAY AND THE RIGHT OF SELECTING OUR OWN LAW MAKERS HAS BEEN GAINED MAINLY BY THEIR EFFORTS. THE EXERCISE OF THESE RIGHTS WILL GIVE THE PEOPLE AN INTEREST IN THE LAWS THAT GOVERN THEM, AND WILL MAKE THEM BETTER MEN AND BETTER CITIZENS."

The names  of over seventy people  are inscribed  on the monument. These are, in order shown on the monument:

FRONT FACE (EAST): Robert Owen (New Lanark), John Bellers, Robert Dale Owen, Abraham Combe, Joseph Lancaster, William Thompson, John Minter Morgan, William Pare, William Galpin, Henry Travis MD, Alex Campbell, James Rigby, W. D. Saull, Julian Hibbert, Rev. Charles Kingsley, Lady Noel Byron, Frances Wright, Thomas Spence, Allan Davenport, Mary Hennell, Francis Place, Harriet Martineau, George Odger, Lloyd Jones
SOUTH FACE: Elizabeth Fry, Sarah Martin, Mary Carpenter, Benjamin Flower, Henry Fawcett, Barbara Bodichon, Maria Grey, Arnold Toynbee, W. K. Clifford, Edward T. Craig, C. Dobson Collet, Charles Bradlaugh, Richard Congreve, William Morris, John Ruskin, F. Power Cobbe, Herbert Spencer, Wathen M.W. Call, Francis Newman, Hodgson Pratt, Lydia Becker, Josephine Butler, Anna Swanwick, C. Jacob Holyoake, J. Kells Ingram
NORTH FACE: Joseph Priestley, Thomas Paine, William Hone, John Stuart Mill, Major Cartwright, Richard Carlile, William Lovett, William Carpenter, Henry Hetherington, John Frost, William Cobbett, W. J. Fox, Richard Moore, William Howitt, Samuel Bamford, Henry Hunt, George Thompson, David Williams, Thomas Wooller, Ebenezer Elliott, Ernest Jones, Alex Macdonald, Richard Cobden, Robert Cooper.

The entry for Robert Owen reads:

The cenotaph to Robert Owen, who was buried in Newtown, Montgomeryshire, Wales, is fittingly at the side of the Reformers' Memorial.

"ROBERT OWEN
PHILANTHROPIST
BORN MAY 14TH. 1771.
DIED NOVR. 17TH. 1858."

"1879
ERECTED BY SUBSCRIPTION
IN MEMORY OF
ROBERT OWEN
OF NEW LANARK,
BORN AT NEWTOWN, N. WALES 1771.
HE DIED AND WAS BURIED
AT THE SAME PLACE 1858,
AGED 87 YEARS.
–––––––––––––
HE ORIGINATED AND ORGANIZED INFANT SCHOOLS, HE SECURED A REDUCTION OF THE HOURS OF LABOUR FOR WOMEN AND CHILDREN IN FACTORIES. HE WAS A LIBERAL SUPPORTER OF THE EARLY EFFORTS IN FAVOUR OF NATIONAL EDUCATION AND LABOURED TO PROMOTE INTERNATIONAL ARBITRATION. HE WAS ONE OF THE FOREMOST ENGLISHMEN [sic] WHO TAUGHT MEN TO ASPIRE TO A HIGHER SOCIAL STATE BY RECONCILING THE INTERESTS OF CAPITAL AND LABOUR. HE SPENT HIS LIFE AND A LARGE FORTUNE IN SEEKING TO IMPROVE HIS FELLOW MEN BY GIVING THEM EDUCATION, SELF-RELIANCE AND MORE WORTH.
HIS LIFE WAS SANCTIFIED BY HUMAN AFFECTION AND LOFTY EFFORT.
J. W. CORFIELD"

"MR. OWEN'S WRITINGS
–––––––––––––––––
REPORT TO THE COUNTY OF LANARK.
NEW VIEWS OF SOCIETY.
TWELVE LECTURES.
LECTURES ON MARRIAGE.
LECTURES ON A NEW STATE OF SOCIETY.
THE BOOK OF THE NEW MORAL WORLD.
SIX LECTURES AT MANCHESTER.
MANIFESTO OF ROBERT OWEN.
SELF SUPPORTING HOME COLONIES.
LETTERS TO THE HUMAN RACE.
REVOLUTION IN MIND AND PRACTICE.
ROBERT OWEN'S JOURNAL.
LIFE OF ROBERT OWEN."

The memorial is listed as grade II.

The Catacombs

The cemetery has three catacombs for the deposit of lead-sealed, triple-shelled coffins and cremated remains. Catacomb A, beneath the North Terrace Colonnade is now sealed. Catacomb Z, beneath the Dissenters' Chapel at the eastern end of the cemetery, suffered significant bomb damage during World War II, and is also closed to further deposits.
Catacomb B, beneath the Anglican Chapel in the centre of the cemetery, has space for some 4,000 deposits, and still offers both private loculi and shelves or vaults for family groups. The catacomb extends under the entire footprint of the chapel and its colonnades. There are six aisles, within which each vault is numbered, running consecutively to number 216 at the south-western end of aisle 6.

Deposit within the catacombs of Kensal Green has always been more expensive and prestigious than burial in a simple plot in the grounds of the cemetery, although less costly than a brick-lined grave or mausoleum. Without the further expense and responsibility of a monument above the grave, the catacombs have afforded a secure, dignified and exclusive resting place for the well-to-do, particularly the unmarried, the childless and young children of those without family plots or mausolea elsewhere.

War graves
The cemetery contains the graves of 473 Commonwealth service personnel of the First World War—half of whom form a war graves plot in the south-west corner, the remainder in small groups or individual graves scattered throughout the grounds—and 51 of the Second who are all dispersed. In the First World War plot, at Section 213, a Screen Wall memorial lists casualties of both world wars whose graves could not be marked by headstones, besides five Second World War servicemen who were cremated at Kensal Green (also known as West London) Crematorium. The highest-ranking person buried here who is commemorated by the CWGC is General Sir Charles Douglas (1850–1914), Chief of the Imperial General Staff in early months of the First World War.

Notable burials

Henry Ainley (1879–1945), actor
Harrison Ainsworth (1805–1882), author
Thomas Allom (1804–1872), artist and architect
Frederick Scott Archer (1813–1857), sculptor, photographer. Inventor of the Collodion process
Charles Phillip Brown (1798–1884), an Englishman known for writing the first Telugu dictionary and for his contributions towards the Telugu language and Andhra people
George Percy Badger (1815–1888), English Anglican missionary and scholar of oriental studies
Betsy Balcombe (1802–1871), as a young girl, a close friend and confidante of Napoleon Bonaparte during his imprisonment on St. Helena Island
Michael William Balfe (1808–1870), composer

Frederick Settle Barff (1822–1866), chemist, inventor of Bower–Barff process
James Barry (1795–1865), surgeon
George Birkbeck (1776–1841), doctor, academic and adult education pioneer
Suzanne Beauclerk, Duchess of St Albans (1921–2010), writer and painter
William Behnes (1795–1864), sculptor
Julius Benedict (1804–1885), composer
Maria Björnson (1949–2002), theatre designer
Charles Blondin (1824–1897), acrobat, tightrope-walker
Sir George Bowen (1821–1899), colonial administrator and 9th Governor of Hong Kong
Diamantina, Lady Bowen (c. 1832/1833 – 1893), grand dame
John Braham (1774–1856), singer
George Bridgetower (1782–1860), West Indian-Polish violin virtuoso and friend of Beethoven
Louis-Charles Mahé de La Bourdonnais (1795–1840), chess master
Howe Browne, 2nd Marquess of Sligo (1788–1845)
Samuel George Bonham (1803–1863), 1st Baronet
J. Lewis Bonhote (1875–1922), zoologist, ornithologist and writer
Isambard Kingdom Brunel (1806–1859), engineer, son of Marc Isambard Brunel and Sophia Kingdom (also buried here)
Marc Isambard Brunel (1769–1849), engineer, father of Isambard
William Burn, eminent Scottish architect (1789–1870)
Pete Burns, lead singer of Dead or Alive (1959-2016)
Peter Burrowes (1753–1841) Irish politician
Decimus Burton (1800–1881), architect
Sir Augustus Wall Callcott (1779–1844), painter
Lady Maria Callcott (1785–1842), travel writer
George Frederick Carden (1798–1874), founder of the cemetery
John Edward Carew (1785–1868), sculptor
Anthony Carlisle (1768–1840), surgeon and scientist
Sir Ernest Cassel (1852–1921), merchant banker
John Hobart Caunter (1792–1851), writer and clergyman
William Cavendish-Scott-Bentinck, 5th Duke of Portland (1800–1879), landowner and eccentric
Frederic Chapman (1823–1895), publisher
 Marigold Frances Churchill, daughter of Sir Winston and Lady Clementine Churchill, who died from a fever in 1921 at age three (the monument by Eric Gill was listed Grade II in 2001). In 2019 the Churchill family acted on a long-held desire to reunite Marigold's remains with the rest of her family in Bladon churchyard. The empty grave and monument will remain at Kensal Green.
Henry Savile Clarke (1841–1893), dramatist and critic
Thomas John Cochrane (Sir) (1789–1872) Cemetery plot number 21777, 1st governor of Newfoundland 1825–34, Member of Parliament for Ipswich 1839–41, Admiral of the fleet 1865–72
Timothy Augustine Coghlan (1856–1926) Australian statistician, engineer and diplomat
Wilkie Collins (1824–1889), author
James Combe (d. 1867), engineer of Temple Works, Leeds
Joshua Compston (1970–1996), curator
Montague Corry, 1st Baron Rowton (1838–1903), secretary to Disraeli and philanthropic founder of Rowton Houses
 Sir Michael Costa (1808-1884), conductor and composer
Anne Crawford (1920–1956), actress 
Rev John Cumming (1807–1881), author
UK Major General Sir Alexander Cunningham KCIE CSI, archaeologist, aide-de-camp to Governor General Lord Aukland of India, executive engineer to the king of Oudh (India), chief engineer of Burma, Colonel of the Royal Engineers.
James Dark (1795–1871), proprietor of Lord's Cricket Ground
Philmore 'Boots' Davidson (1928–1993) Trinidadian musician. Introduced the steel band to Britain
Admiral Ross Donnelly (1761–1840)
John Doubleday (about 1798–1856), restorer at the British Museum who reassembled the Portland Vase 
Andrew Ducrow (1793–1842), circus performer and horse-rider
Willie Edouin (1841–1908), comedian, actor and theatre manager
Sir George Elliot (1784–1863), naval officer
Dr John Epps (1805–1869), phrenologist
John Edward Errington (1806–1862) civil engineer
Edward Francis Fitzwilliam (1824–1857), composer
Fanny Fitzwilliam (1801–1854), actress, singer and theatre manager
Ann Foster (1827–1882), widow of John Foster of Hobart, Member of the Tasmanian Legislative Assembly. Formerly Ann Dinham, she was transported to Tasmania in 1852 and was one of few Australian convicts to return to her native land (Grave No. 28305)
Henri Jean-Baptiste Victoire Fradelle (1778–1865), Franco-English Victorian painter
Erich Fried (1921–1988), Austrian poet and essayist
Henry Gauntlett (1810–1876), composer
John Gibson (1817–1892), architect. RIBA Gold Medal recipient 1890
Sir Walter Raleigh Gilbert (1785–1853)
George Bellas Greenough (1778–1855), geologist
George Grossmith (1847–1912), actor and comedian
Philip Hardwick (1792–1870), architect
Philip Charles Hardwick (1822–1892), architect
Fairlie Harmar Viscountess Harbeton RA (1876–1945) painter and suffragette
Henry Hawkins, 1st Baron Brampton (1817–1907)
Catherine Hayes (1818–1861), opera singer
Henry Herman (1832–1894), English dramatist and novelist
Rev Ridley Herschell (1807–1864)
Major General Sir John Hills FRSE CB KCB (1834–1902)
Thomas Hood (1799–1845), poet, humorist and journalist

Henry Howard, 3rd Earl of Effingham (1837–1898)
Sir Neville Howse (1863–1930), the first Australian recipient of the Victoria Cross, and one of 13 holders of the award buried in this cemetery
Joseph Hume (1777–1855), MP and political campaigner
James Henry Leigh Hunt (1784–1859), Romantic critic, essayist and poet
Austen Hurgon (1862–1942), theatrical director
Frank Linsly James (1851–1890), exhumed in 1917 and re-interred in the family plot at West Dean, West Sussex
Sir Leander Starr Jameson (1853–1917), former Prime Minister of Cape Colony and architect of the Jameson Raid – initially buried in a vault here, later reburied in Matobo Hills, Zimbabwe
Lionel Johnson (1867–1902), poet, member of the Rhymer's Club and an influence on W. B. Yeats
Charles Kemble (1775–1854), actor and theatre manager
Fanny Kemble (1809–1893), famous British actress and author
Halina Korn (1902–1978), Polish painter and sculptor
Marian Kukiel (1885–1972), Polish General and Minister for War in exile during World War II
Michael Lane (1802–1868), civil engineer
William Garrett Lewis (b. before 1834; d. 1885) pastor of Westbourne Grove Church
Wyndham Lewis (1882–1957), painter and author, co-founder of the Vorticist movement
Joseph Locke (1805–1860), civil engineer
John St. John Long (1798–1834), quack doctor
John Claudius Loudon (1783–1843), Scottish botanist and writer on cemeteries
John Graham Lough (1789–1876), sculptor
Sir John Louis, 2nd Baronet (1785–1863)
Sir Andrew Lusk, 1st Baronet (1810–1909) Lord Mayor of London 1873–74
John Robinson McClean (1817–1873), politician
Vice Admiral Sir Robert John Le Mesurier McClure CB (1807–1873) discoverer of the Northwest Passage 1850–53
Alexander McDonnell (1798–1835), chess master
Richard Graves MacDonnell (1814–1881), colonial administrator and 6th Governor of Hong Kong
Sir James McGrigor (1771–1858), Scottish botanist
Sir Donald Friell McLeod (1810–1872)
William Macready (1793–1873), actor
Sir George Makins (1853–1933), surgeon
Edward Maltby (1770–1859), bishop of Durham
Florence Marryat (1833–1899), novelist, editor, actress and playwright
Kitty Melrose (1883–1912), actress
Archibald Menzies (1754–1842), botanist, surgeon
Ras Andargachew Messai (1902–1981), Ethiopian ruler
Kate Meyrick (1875–1933), night club owner
John Maddison Morton (1811–1891), playwright
John Lothrop Motley (1814–1877), American historian
Billy Murdoch (1854–1911), Australian cricket captain
John Trivett Nettleship (1841–1902), painter and author
Feargus O'Connor (1796–1855), MP, Chartist Leader & social reformer
Patrick O'Connell (1887–1959), Footballer with Belfast Celtic, captain of Ireland & Manchester United (1914), Manager of Barcelona FC during Spanish Civil War
Admiral Robert Otway (1773–1846)
Robert Owen (cenotaph only) (1771–1858), industrialist and major social reformer
John Thomas Perceval (1803–1876), army officer, writer and campaigner
Jacob Perkins (1766–1849), American inventor
George Perry (1793–1862), composer
Harold Pinter (1930–2008), playwright, actor, director, screenwriter, poet and political activist
Frederic Hervey Foster Quin (1799–1878), physician
Sir Terence Rattigan (1911–1977), playwright
Emidio Recchioni (1864–1933), Italian anarchist and businessman
Robert Reece (1838–1891), comic playwright and librettist
Emil Reich (1854–1910), Austro-Hungarian-born historian
John Rennie the Younger (1794–1874) civil engineer

Dwarkanath Tagore (1794–1846), Bengali industrialist and benefactor
John Wigham Richardson (1837–1908), shipbuilder
Charles Ritchie, 1st Baron Ritchie of Dundee (1838–1906), politician, former Chancellor of Exchequer
Henry Sandham (1842–1910), artist
Eileen Sharp (1900 –1958), singer and actress 
Byam Shaw (1872–1919), artist
John Shaw Jr. (1803–1870), architect and brother-in-law of Philip Hardwick listed above
Sir William Siemens (1823–1883), industrialist
Robert William Sievier (1794–1865), sculptor (also member of Cemetery board)
John Benjamin Smith (1794–1879), MP
John Mark Frederick Smith (1790–1874), British Army general
William Henry Smith (1792–1865), businessman
Alexis Benoît Soyer (1810–1858), Chef and Humanitarian. 
Howard Staunton (1810–1874), prominent chess player
John McDouall Stuart (1815–1866), explorer in Australia

William Makepeace Thackeray (1811–1863), writer
Bert Thomas (1883–1966), cartoonist
Lydia Thompson (1838–1908), dancer and actress
Thérèse Tietjens (1831–1877), opera singer
Sir Nicholas Conyngham Tindal (1776–1846), Solicitor General and Lord Chief Justice of the Common Pleas
Steve Peregrin Took (1949–1980), English musician and songwriter (best known as a founding member of Tyrannosaurus Rex)
Anthony Trollope (1815–1882), novelist
Sir Thomas Troubridge, 3rd Baronet (1815–1867), British army officer
J. Stuart Russell (1816–1895), theologian and author
James Malcolm Rymer (1814–1884), writer
William Vincent Wallace (1812–1865), composer
Thomas Wakley (1795–1862), surgeon, campaigner and founder of The Lancet
John William Waterhouse (1849–1917), artist
John Whichcord Jr. (1823–1885), architect
Jane Williams (1798–1884), subject of poems by Percy Bysshe Shelley
Alfred Wigan (1814–1878), actor-manager
William Williams (1788–1865), radical MP
Walter Clopton Wingfield (1833–1912), pioneer of lawn tennis

The cemetery is remarkable for the number of Fellows of the Royal Society who are buried there, of whom the following is a small sample:

Charles Babbage FRS (1816) (1791–1871), mathematician and computer scientist
George Bishop FRS (1848)
William John Broderip FRS (1828)
Robert Brown FRS (1839) (1773–1858), botanist, discoverer of Brownian motion
Samuel Hawksley Burbury FRS (1890)
George Busk FRS (1850) (1807–1886), naval surgeon, zoologist and palaeontologist
Alexander John Ellis FRS (1864)
Hugh Falconer FRS (1845) (1808–1865), naturalist
David Forbes FRS (1858), mineralogist
Thomas Galloway FRS (1848)
John Hall Gladstone FRS (1853)
Joseph Glynn FRS (1838)
John Gould FRS (1843)
William Robert Grove Sir, FRS (1847)
Edmond Herbert Grove-Hills FRS (1911)
Frank McClean FRS (1895)
George Newport FRS (1846)
Reverend Baden Powell, FRS (1824) father of Robert and Agnes Baden-Powell
Joseph Sabine FRS (1799)
George James Symons FRS (1879)
Edward Troughton FRS (1810)
Edward Turner FRS (1830), chemist
Nathaniel Wallich FRS (1829)
Sir Charles Wheatstone FRS FRSE (1802–1875) inventor of the Wheatstone bridge

Royal burials
British
Prince Augustus Frederick, Duke of Sussex and son of King George III
Princess Sophia, sister of Prince Augustus Frederick and daughter of King George III
Prince George, Duke of Cambridge, grandson of George III and commander-in-chief of the British Army
Overseas
Maharani Jind Kaur, of the Sikh Empire, mother of the last Punjabi Maharaja Duleep Singh – temporarily deposited in the catacomb below the Dissenters' Chapel following her death in exile in 1863 before her body was allowed to return to the Punjab for cremation. Following the discovery of a slab commemorating Jind Kaur (now in the Ancient House Museum, Thetford), a memorial was erected here in 2009.

Notable cremations

 Major Herbert James (1888–1958), VC winner at Gallipoli, First World War.
 Ingrid Bergman (1915–1982), actress (most of her ashes were scattered around the islet of Dannholmen off the fishing village of Fjällbacka on the west coast of Sweden where she spent most summers from 1958 to her death in 1982, with the remainder of her ashes buried at Norra begravningsplatsen in Stockholm, Sweden next to her parents).
 Freddie Mercury (1946–1991), singer in the rock band Queen, is commemorated by a small plinth under his birth name, Farrokh Bulsara.
 Sir Anthony Nutting (1920–1999), former diplomat and Conservative MP.
 Alan Rickman (1946–2016), actor and director.
 Pete Burns (1959–2016), Singer–songwriter and TV personality 
 Christine Keeler (1942–2017).
 Gary Rhodes (1960–2019), chef

The Friends of Kensal Green Cemetery
Although the cemetery is owned and run by the General Cemetery Company, The Friends of Kensal Green Cemetery is a charitable organisation whose purpose is the preservation, conservation and restoration for the public benefit of Kensal Green Cemetery. The charity organises tours and other events in the cemetery and has published books about the cemetery. The office of the Friends is in the Dissenters Chapel. The Friends group is a member of The National Federation of Cemetery Friends.

See also
 Dissenters' Chapel, Kensal Green
 List of notable burials at Kensal Green Cemetery
 St Mary's Catholic Cemetery, Kensal Green

Sources
 Records held at Kensal Green Cemetery

References

External links

 
 Friends of the Cemetery.
 Aerial view from 1938, from the English Heritage "Britain from Above" archive

1832 establishments in England
Anglican cemeteries in the United Kingdom
Cemeteries in London
Commonwealth War Graves Commission cemeteries in England
Grade I listed parks and gardens in London
Grade II* listed buildings in the Royal Borough of Kensington and Chelsea
Grade II listed buildings in the Royal Borough of Kensington and Chelsea
Parks and open spaces in the Royal Borough of Kensington and Chelsea
Burial sites of the Spencer-Churchill family
Kensal Green
Rural cemeteries